Tochihikari Masayuki (29 August 1933 – 28 March 1977) was a sumo wrestler from Kumamoto Prefecture in Japan who reached the second highest rank of ōzeki in 1962. He joined Kasugano stable in 1952 and reached the top makuuchi division in 1955. He never won a top division championship but was a tournament runner-up four times. He was promoted to ōzeki in May 1962 alongside his stablemate Tochinoumi. He fought as an ōzeki for 22 tournaments but lost the rank after recording three consecutive losing scores and immediately announced his retirement in January 1966. He became an elder of the Japan Sumo Association under the name Chiganoura. He was a judge of tournament bouts and was involved in both the incorrect decision to award a win to Toda that stopped Taiho's 45 bout winning streak in March 1969 and the famous decision in January 1972 to declare Kitanofuji the winner over Takanohana by kabai-te. He died of rectal cancer at the age of 43.  His shikona of Tochihikari was subsequently used by a later wrestler from Kasugano stable, also known as Kaneshiro Kofuku.

Pre-modern career record
In 1953 the New Year tournament was begun and the Spring tournament began to be held in Osaka.

Modern career record
Since the addition of the Kyushu tournament in 1957 and the Nagoya tournament in 1958, the yearly schedule has remained unchanged.

See also
Glossary of sumo terms
List of past sumo wrestlers
List of sumo tournament top division runners-up
List of sumo tournament second division champions
List of ōzeki

References

1933 births
1977 deaths
Japanese sumo wrestlers
Sumo people from Kumamoto Prefecture
Ōzeki